The NSW TrainLink Regional Train Project is an initiative of Transport for NSW to procure new bi-mode CAF Civity trains to replace NSW TrainLink's Endeavour, Xplorer and XPT fleets.

History
In the lead up to the 2015 state election, the Baird Government committed itself to replacing the XPT fleet (19 power cars and 60 carriages) if re-elected. Having been returned to office, in October 2016, the government announced it was also considering replacing the Xplorer (23 carriages) and Endeavour (28 carriages) diesel multiple unit fleets.

In August 2017, the government announced it had decided to proceed with the replacement of all three fleets. In November 2017, three consortia, led by Bombardier, CAF and Downer, were shortlisted for the contract to build the trains. In May 2018, the Bombardier Consortium withdrew from the process.

A contract was signed in February 2019 with Momentum Trains, a consortium of CAF, DIF Infrastructure and Pacific Partnerships. The order will comprise 117 bi-mode Civity carriages which will make up a total of 29 trains:
 10 long (6-car) trainsets for use on long-distance Regional services (replacing the XPT fleet)
 9 short (3-car) short-distance Regional trainsets (replacing the Xplorer fleet)
 10 short (3-car) Intercity sets (replacing the Endeavour fleet)

All trains will be maintained at the new Mindyarra Maintenance Centre to be built in Dubbo.

 there is no delivery date on the Project website. An article in the Sydney Morning Herald dated 26 December 2022 indicates a 35-month delay in the project. This pushes the delivery date out to late 2026 or 2027.

References

External links
Project information

CAF multiple units
Hybrid multiple units
NSW TrainLink
Proposed public transport in Australia
1500 V DC multiple units of New South Wales
Electric multiple units of New South Wales